The Khirbet Beit Lei graffiti are seven inscriptions in Hebrew in various states of preservation found in the excavations at Khirbet Beit Lei. 

Of particular interest is one inscription containing a very early appearance in Hebrew of the name  (Jerusalem).

Interpretation
There is disagreement about how they should be read. It appears that the words YHWH (Yahweh) and YRŠLM (Jerusalem) feature in the inscriptions, which Joseph Naveh dated to the late 6th century BCE.

Naveh read it as
  
which he translated as "Yahweh (is) the God of the whole earth; the mountains of Judah belong to him, to the God of Jerusalem". An older example on papyrus is known from the previous century.

Frank Moore Cross disagreed with many of Naveh's readings of the letters, instead interpreting the inscription as a poetic rubric in the first person: "I am Yahweh thy God: I will accept the cities of Judah, and will redeem Jerusalem". Cross speculated that it was "the citation of a lost prophecy", perhaps written by a refugee fleeing the 587 BCE destruction of Jerusalem. Naveh later dismissed Cross's reading and stuck to his own version.

Other scholars, including Lemaire and Puech, have proposed additional readings. Patrick D. Miller read it almost the same as Cross did: "[I am] Yahweh your God. I will accept the cities of Judah. I will redeem Jerusalem."

References

6th-century BC inscriptions
Hebrew inscriptions
 Archaeological discoveries in Israel
 Jerusalem
Graffiti (archaeology)
Yahweh
Southern District (Israel)